Kanamat Khuseevich Botashev (20 May 1959 – 22 May 2022) was a Russian major general who was the commander of the military unit 23326 of the Western Military District and the commander of the Voronezh Malshevo airbase near Voronezh. He was posthumously awarded the title Hero of the Russian Federation.

Biography
In 1976, he graduated from high school. In 2010, he graduated from the Military Academy of the General Staff of the Armed Forces of Russia.

On 29 December 2012, a criminal case was opened against him under Article 351 of the Criminal Code (violation of flight rules) for crashing a SU-27 plane while violating flight rules. He had reportedly piloted the aircraft without undergoing proper training and pre-flight medical checks, and then decided to perform aerobatics and thus accidentally destroyed the SU-27. Botashev was sentenced to four years probation with a fine of 5 million rubles. In 2013 he was discharged from the army. After that he worked as deputy head of DOSAAF in Saint Petersburg and Leningrad Oblast for aviation, and deputy director of an aeroclub in Saint Petersburg.

According to Ukrainian media, he took part in the 2022 Russian invasion of Ukraine and died on 22 May 2022 near Popasna, piloting a Sukhoi Su-25 attack aircraft, which was shot down by a FIM-92 Stinger. Russian media later confirmed his death in combat in Ukraine. Observers speculated that Botashev had been flying as a mercenary pilot for the Wagner Group.

See also 
 List of Russian generals killed during the 2022 invasion of Ukraine

References 

1959 births
2022 deaths
Russian major generals
Eastern Ukraine offensive
Russian military personnel killed in the 2022 Russian invasion of Ukraine
Frunze Military Academy alumni
Military Academy of the General Staff of the Armed Forces of Russia alumni
Soviet Air Force officers
Russian Air Force generals
People from Karachayevsky District
Russian mercenaries
Russian aviators